Glutaminase 2 (liver, mitochondrial) is a protein that in humans is encoded by the GLS2 gene.

Structure
The GLS2 gene is on the 12th chromosome in humans, with its specific location being 12q13.3. It contains 19 exons.

Function
GLS2 is a part of the glutaminase family. The protein encoded by this gene is a mitochondrial phosphate-activated glutaminase that catalyzes the hydrolysis of glutamine to stoichiometric amounts of glutamate and ammonia. Originally thought to be liver-specific, this protein has been found in other tissues as well. Alternative splicing results in multiple transcript variants that encode different isoforms.

Clinical significance
GLS2 has interesting molecular relationships with tumor progression and cancer. Glutaminase 2 negatively regulates the PI3K/AKT signaling and shows tumor suppression activity in human hepatocellular carcinoma. Additionally, silencing of GLS and overexpression of GLS2 genes cooperate in decreasing the proliferation and viability of glioblastoma cells.

References

Further reading

 
 
 
 
 
 
 
 
 

Genes
Human proteins